Legionella rubrilucens is a Gram-negative bacterium from the genus Legionella which was isolated from tap water in Los Angeles, hot spring water in Niigata in Japan, and a patient who suffered from pneumonia.

References

External links
Type strain of Legionella rubrilucens at BacDive -  the Bacterial Diversity Metadatabase

Legionellales
Bacteria described in 1985